Caleb Sawyer October 9, 1806 – March 14, 1881) was an American farmer and politician

Sawyer was born in New Hampshire and moved to Elgin, Wabasha County, Minnesota, with his wife and family in 1856. Sawyer served in the Minnesota House of Representatives in 1867 and 1868 and was a Republican.

References

1806 births
1881 deaths
People from Wabasha County, Minnesota
People from New Hampshire
Farmers from Minnesota
Republican Party members of the Minnesota House of Representatives